Events in the year 2005 in Greece.

Incumbents

Events

 21 May - Helena Paparizou wins the Eurovision Song Contest with the song "My Number One", Greece's first victory in the contest.

Sports

References

 
Years of the 21st century in Greece
Greece
2000s in Greece
Greece